The 2004–05 season was the 112th in the history of VfB Stuttgart and their 28th consecutive season in the top flight. The club participated in the Bundesliga and the DFB-Pokal.

Players

Competitions

Overall record

Bundesliga

League table

Results summary

Results by round

Matches

DFB-Pokal

References 

VfB Stuttgart seasons
VfB Stuttgart